Diplomatic relations exist between the Republic of Austria and the United Mexican States. Both nations are members of the OECD and the United Nations.

History 

In July 1842, the Austrian Empire and Mexico established diplomatic relations after signing a treaty of Friendship, Navigation and Commerce between the two nations. In December 1861, Emperor Napoleon III of France invaded Mexico. After successfully taking over the country, Emperor Napoleon III, along with the Mexican aristocracy, offered the crown of Mexico to his Austrian cousin, Maximilian of Habsburg. In April 1864, Maximilian, along with his wife Carlota set sail for Mexico and upon arrival to the country in May 1864, Maximilian was declared Emperor of Mexico. This period was known as the Second Mexican Empire.

The reign of Emperor Maximilian was engulfed in constant conflict between his French backed government and the government in exile of Benito Juárez. In 1866, France withdrew its army from Mexico and in June 1867, Emperor Maximilian was captured by Juárez forces in Querétaro City and executed along with two of his generals, thus ending the empire. After the execution of Maximilian, diplomatic relations between Austria and Mexico were severed until 1901.

In 1938, Mexico became the only country to protest against the Anschluss of Austria at the League of Nations. During World War II, Austria was part of the German Reich and in May 1942 Mexico declared war on Germany after the destruction of two Mexican oil tankers in the Gulf of Mexico by German U-boats. After the war, normal relations were restored between the two nations.

Over the years, diplomatic relations between the two nations have strengthened. In 2005, President Heinz Fischer became the first Austrian head of state to pay a visit to Mexico. In 2006, former President Vicente Fox reciprocated the visit by paying a state visit to Austria. In 2011, the Colegio Austriaco Mexicano opened in Querétaro City.

There has been much discussion between the two nations over whether Austria should return Moctezuma's headdress to Mexico alongside various other pre-Hispanic artifacts that were taken into to Austria in 1519 and are currently on display at the Museum of Ethnology in Vienna. In July 2014, it was declared that the headdress was too fragile to travel and therefore cannot be returned to Mexico. In 2018, Austria acknowledged and thanked Mexico on the 80th anniversary of Mexico's protest against the Anschluss.

High-level visits

High-level visits from Austria to Mexico
 Foreign Minister Willibald Pahr (1981)
 Chancellor Wolfgang Schüssel (2004)
 President Heinz Fischer (2005)

High-level visits from Mexico to Austria
 President Vicente Fox (2006)
 Foreign Minister Luis Ernesto Derbez (2006)
 Foreign Minister Patricia Espinosa Cantellano (2007, 2010, 2012)
 Foreign Undersecretary Carlos de Icaza González (2016)

Bilateral agreements
Both nations have signed several bilateral agreements such as an Agreement on Cultural Exchanges (1974); Agreement on Air Transportation (1995); Agreement on the Promotion and Protection of Investments (1998) and an Agreement on the Avoidance of Double-Taxation and Tax Evasion (2004).

Trade relations 
In 1997, Mexico and the European Union (which includes Austria) signed a free trade agreement. In 2018, two-way trade between both nations amounted to US$2.1 billion. Austria is Mexico's 34th biggest foreign direct investor. Between 1999 - 2016, Austrian companies invested over US$284 million in Mexico. Austria's main exports to Mexico include: pharmaceutical products, steel, aluminum and paper. Mexico's main exports to Austria include: machinery, electronics, car parts and beer. Mexican multinational companies América Móvil and Nemak operate in Austria.

Resident diplomatic missions 

 Austria has an embassy in Mexico City.
 Mexico has an embassy in Vienna.

See also 
 Foreign relations of Austria 
 Foreign relations of Mexico
 Austrian Mexicans
 French intervention in Mexico
 Mexikoplatz

References 

 
Mexico
Bilateral relations of Mexico